Clube Atlético Pirassununguense, commonly known as Pirassununguense, is a currently inactive Brazilian football club based in Pirassununga, São Paulo state.

History
The club was founded on September 1, 1907. Pirassununguense won the Campeonato Paulista do Interior in 1954.

The entire football history of the city of Pirassununga necessarily passes through Clube Atlético Pirassununguense.  Traditional Mogiana team, and one of the oldest in the country, CAP has always been in the disputes promoted by the São Paulo leagues.

Achievements

 Campeonato Paulista do Interior:
 Winners (1): 1954

Stadium
Clube Atlético Pirassununguense play their home games at Estádio Belarmino Del Nero, nicknamed BDN. The stadium has a maximum capacity of 5,300 people.

References

Association football clubs established in 1907
Football clubs in São Paulo (state)
1907 establishments in Brazil